Virginia Beach is an independent city located on the southeastern coast of the Commonwealth of Virginia in the United States. The population was 459,470 at the 2020 census. Although mostly suburban in character, it is the most populous city in the Commonwealth of Virginia, fifth-most populous city in the Mid-Atlantic, ninth-most populous city in the Southeast and the 42nd-most populous city in the U.S. Located on the Atlantic Ocean at the mouth of the Chesapeake Bay, Virginia Beach is the largest city in the Hampton Roads metropolitan area. This area, known as "America's First Region", also includes the independent cities of Chesapeake, Hampton, Newport News, Norfolk, Portsmouth, and Suffolk, as well as other smaller cities, counties, and towns of Hampton Roads.

Virginia Beach is a resort city with miles of beaches and hundreds of hotels, motels, and restaurants along its oceanfront. Every year the city hosts the East Coast Surfing Championships as well as the Something in the Water music festival, It is also home to several state parks, several long-protected beach areas, military bases, a number of large corporations, Virginia Wesleyan University and Regent University, the international headquarters and site of the television broadcast studios for Christian Broadcasting Network (CBN), Edgar Cayce's Association for Research and Enlightenment, and numerous historic sites. Near the point where the Chesapeake Bay and the Atlantic Ocean meet, Cape Henry was the site of the first landing of the English colonists, who eventually settled in Jamestown, on April 26, 1607.

The city is listed in the Guinness Book of Records as having the longest pleasure beach in the world. It is located at the southern end of the Chesapeake Bay Bridge-Tunnel, which was the world's longest bridge-tunnel complex until the Hong Kong-Zhuhai-Macau Bridge opened in 2018.

History

The Chesepian were the historic indigenous people of the area now known as Tidewater in Virginia at the time of European encounter. Little is known about them but archeological evidence suggests they may have been related to the Carolina Algonquian, or Pamlico people. They would have spoken one of the Algonquian languages. These were common among the numerous tribes of the coastal area, who made up the loose Powhatan Confederacy, numbering in the tens of thousands in population. The Chesepian occupied an area which is now defined as the independent cities of Norfolk, Portsmouth, Chesapeake, and Virginia Beach.

In 1607, after a voyage of 144 days, three ships headed by Captain Christopher Newport, and carrying 105 men and boys, made their first landfall in the New World on the mainland, where the southern mouth of the Chesapeake Bay meets the Atlantic Ocean. They named it Cape Henry, after Henry Frederick, Prince of Wales, the eldest son of King James I of England. These English colonists of the Virginia Company of London moved on from this area, as they were under orders to seek a site further inland, which would be more sheltered from ships of competing European countries. They created their first permanent settlement on the north side of the James River at Jamestown.

Adam Thoroughgood (1604–1640) of King's Lynn, Norfolk, England is one of the earliest Englishmen to settle in this area, which was developed as Virginia Beach. At the age of 18, he had contracted as an indentured servant to pay for passage to the Virginia Colony in the hopes of bettering his life. He earned his freedom after several years and became a leading citizen of the area. In 1629, he was elected to the House of Burgesses for Elizabeth Cittie , one of four "cities" (or incorporations) which were subdivided areas established in 1619.

In 1634, the Colony was divided into the original eight shires of Virginia, soon renamed as counties. Thoroughgood is credited with using the name of his home in England when helping name "New Norfolk County" in 1637. The following year, New Norfolk County was split into Upper Norfolk County (soon renamed Nansemond County) and Lower Norfolk County. Thoroughgood resided after 1634 was along the Lynnhaven River, named for his home in England.

Lower Norfolk County was large when first organized, defined as from the Atlantic Ocean west past the Elizabeth River, encompassing the entire area now within the modern cities of Portsmouth, Norfolk, Chesapeake, and Virginia Beach. It attracted many entrepreneurs, including William Moseley with his family in 1648. Belonging to the Merchant Adventurers Guild of London, he immigrated from Rotterdam of the Netherlands, where he had been in international trade. He settled on land on the north side of the Elizabeth River, east of what developed as Norfolk.

Following the increased settlement, in 1691 Lower Norfolk County was divided to form Norfolk and Princess Anne counties. Princess Anne, the easternmost county in South Hampton Roads, extended from Cape Henry at the mouth of the Chesapeake Bay, south to what became the border of the North Carolina colony. It included all of the area fronting the Atlantic Ocean. Princess Anne County was known as a jurisdiction from 1691 to 1963, over 250 years.

In the early centuries, this area was rural and developed for plantation agriculture. In the late 19th century, the small resort area of Virginia Beach developed in Princess Anne County after the 1883 arrival of rail service to the coast. The Virginia Beach Hotel was opened and operated by the Norfolk and Virginia Beach Railroad and Improvement Company at the oceanfront, near the tiny community of Seatack. The hotel was foreclosed and the railroad was reorganized in 1887. The hotel was upgraded and reopened in 1888 as the Princess Anne Hotel.

In 1891, guests at the new hotel watched the wreck and rescue efforts of the United States Life-Saving Service for the Norwegian bark Dictator. The ship's figurehead, which washed up on the beach several days later, was erected as a monument to the victims and rescuers. It stood along the oceanfront for more than 50 years. In the 21st century, it inspired the pair of matching Norwegian Lady Monuments, sculpted by Ørnulf Bast and installed in Virginia Beach and Moss, Norway.

The resort initially depended on railroad and electric trolley service. The completion of Virginia Beach Boulevard in 1922, which extended from Norfolk to the oceanfront, opened the route for automobiles, buses, and trucks. The passenger rail service to the oceanfront was eventually discontinued as traffic increased by vehicles. The growing resort of Virginia Beach became an incorporated town in 1906. Over the next 45 years, Virginia Beach continued to grow in popularity as a seasonal vacation spot. The casinos were replaced by amusement parks and family-oriented attractions. In 1927 The Cavalier Hotel opened and became a popular vacation spot.

Virginia Beach gained status as an independent city in 1952, although ties remained between it and Princess Anne County. In 1963, after voters in the two jurisdictions passed a supporting referendum, and with the approval of the Virginia General Assembly, the two political subdivisions were consolidated as a new, much larger independent city, retaining the better-known name of the Virginia Beach resort.

The Alan B. Shepard Civic Center ("The Dome"), a significant building in the city's history because of the many famous musical acts played there, was constructed in 1958, and was dedicated to the career of former Virginia Beach resident and astronaut Alan Shepard. As the area changed, the Dome was frequently used as a bingo hall. The building was razed in 1994 to make room for a municipal parking lot and potential future development.

Recent history
Real estate, defense, and tourism are major sectors of the Virginia Beach economy. Local public and private groups have maintained a vested interest in real-estate redevelopment, resulting in a number of joint public-private projects, such as commercial parks. Examples of the public-private development include the Virginia Beach Convention Center, the Oceanfront Hilton Hotel, and the Virginia Beach Town Center. The city assisted in financing the project through the use of tax increment financing: creating special tax districts and constructing associated street and infrastructure to support the developments. The Town Center opened in 2003, with related construction continuing. The Convention Center opened in 2005.

The city has begun to run out of clear land available for new construction north of the Green Line, an urban growth boundary dividing the urban northern and rural southern sections of the city. Infill and development of residential neighborhoods has placed a number of operating constraints on Naval Air Station Oceana, a major fighter jet base for the U.S. Navy. While the airbase enjoys wide support from Virginia Beach at large, the Pentagon Base Realignment and Closure commission has proposed closure of Oceana within the next decade.  In 2012 a Navy jet that took off from Oceana experienced engine failure and crashed into an apartment complex.

This land crunch led to floodplain development. During Hurricane Matthew, the heavy rainfall flooded over 2000 homes and left some neighborhoods with standing water for days. Given the rising risks of flooding due to climate change and the impetus of the hurricane damage, the city rejected several further development proposals. This rejection was significant from two perspectives. First, cities reject building very rarely, demonstrating the shift in public perception. Second, these rejections led to lawsuits by the developers. The rejection of these lawsuits in the courts provides precedent for other sorts of local climate change adaptation efforts in the future. Discussing the matter, Mayor Dyer noted, "It's a confrontation with reality. Not everybody's going to be happy.”

On May 31, 2019, a mass shooting occurred at a municipal government building in Virginia Beach. A former employee entered the building and shot indiscriminately, killing 12 people and injuring four others before dying from a gunshot wound fired by responding officers.

Geography 

It is the largest city in Virginia by total area and third-largest city by land area. A major portion of the city drains to the Chesapeake Bay by way of the Lynnhaven River and its tributaries.

The city is located at the southeastern corner of Virginia in the Hampton Roads area bordering the Atlantic Ocean. The Hampton Roads Metropolitan Statistical Area (officially known as the Virginia Beach-Norfolk-Newport News, VA-NC MSA) is the 37th largest in the United States, with a total population of 1,707,639. The area includes the Virginia cities of Norfolk, Virginia Beach, Chesapeake, Hampton, Newport News, Poquoson, Portsmouth, Suffolk, Williamsburg, and the counties of Gloucester, Isle of Wight, James City, Mathews, Surry, and York, as well as the North Carolina county of Currituck. While Virginia Beach is the most populated city within the MSA, it actually currently functions more as a suburb. The city of Norfolk is recognized as the central business district, while the Virginia Beach oceanside resort district and Williamsburg are primarily centers of tourism.

Neighborhoods 

When the modern city of Virginia Beach was created in 1963, by the consolidation of the  Princess Anne County with the  City of Virginia Beach, the newly larger city was divided into seven boroughs: Bayside, Blackwater, Kempsville, Lynnhaven, Princess Anne, Pungo, and Virginia Beach.

Virginia Beach has many distinctive communities and neighborhoods within its boundaries, including: Alanton, Aragona Village, the largest sub-division in Tidewater when completed, Bay Colony, Bayside, Cape Henry, Chesapeake Beach, Croatan Beach, Great Neck Point, Green Run, Kempsville, Lago Mar, Larkspur, London Bridge, Lynnhaven, Newtown, The North End, Oceana, Ocean Park, Pembroke Manor, Princess Anne, Pungo, Red Mill Commons, Sandbridge, Shadowlawn, Thalia, and Thoroughgood.

Climate

The climate of Virginia Beach is humid subtropical (Köppen: Cfa). For the Trewartha update system the climate is the northern limit of Cf (subtropical) which corresponds to the ecology of the area, which struggles to withstand the cooler temperatures further north or inland.

Winters are cool and snowfall is light. Summers are hot and humid. The official weather statistics are recorded at Norfolk International Airport on the extreme northwestern border of Virginia Beach. The wettest season is summer, specifically July to early September, with August the single wettest month, averaging over 5.5 inches of rain. From October to June, average monthly precipitation is remarkably consistent, ranging between 3.1 and 3.7 inches.

This means that in spite of the mild normals, most years record at least one ice day, with rare exceptions. Summer nights are sometimes really hot.

Additionally, the geographic location of the city, with respect to the principal storm tracks, is especially favorable which is why it has earned the reputation as a vacation destination. It is south of the average path of storms originating in the higher latitudes, and north of the usual tracks of hurricanes and other major tropical storms, with the exception of Hurricane Isabel in 2003. Because of the moderating effects of the Chesapeake Bay and the Atlantic Ocean, Virginia Beach is the northernmost location on the east coast in which many species of plants (both subtropical and tropical) will reliably grow. Spanish moss, for example is near the northernmost limit of its natural range at First Landing State Park, and is the most northerly location where it is widespread. Other plants like the Windmill Palm, Sabal palmetto, Butia odorata (in protected locations), and Oleander are successfully grown here while they succumb to the colder winter temperatures to the north and inland to the west. The hardiness zone is 8b along the coast and in Urban areas, and 8a inland and to the northwest.

Demographics

2020 census

Note: the US Census treats Hispanic/Latino as an ethnic category. This table excludes Latinos from the racial categories and assigns them to a separate category. Hispanics/Latinos can be of any race.

2010 census

According to the 2010 Census, the racial composition of Virginia Beach was as follows:
 White or Caucasian: 67.7% (Non-Hispanic White: 64.5%)
 Black or African American: 19.6%
 Native American: 0.4%
 Asian: 6.1% (4.0% Filipino, 0.5% Chinese, 0.4% Indian, 0.4% Vietnamese, 0.3% Korean, 0.2% Japanese)
 Native Hawaiian and Other Pacific Islander: 0.1%
 Some other race: 2.0%
 Two or more races: 4.0%
 Hispanic or Latino (of any race): 6.6% (2.2% Puerto Rican, 1.9% Mexican, 0.3% Dominican, 0.2% Panamanian, 0.2% Salvadoran, 0.2% Cuban, 0.2% Colombian)

As of the 2000 Census, there were 425,257 people, 154,455 households, and 110,898 families residing in the city. The population density was 1,712.7 people per square mile (661.3/km2). There were 162,277 housing units at an average density of 653.6 per square mile (252.3/km2).

There were 154,455 households, out of which 38.8% had children under the age of 18 living with them, 55.7% were married couples living together, 12.4% had a female householder with no husband present, and 28.2% were non-families. 20.4% of all households were made up of individuals, and 5.5% had someone living alone who was 65 years of age or older. The average household size was 2.70 and the average family size was 3.14.

The age distribution was 27.5% under the age of 18, 10.0% from 18 to 24, 34.3% from 25 to 44, 19.8% from 45 to 64, and 8.4% who were 65 years of age or older. The median age was 33 years. For every 100 females, there were 98.0 males. For every 100 females age 18 and over, there were 95.8 males.

The median income for a household in the city was $48,705, and the median income for a family was $53,242. Virginia Beach had the 5th highest median family income among large cities in 2003. The per capita income for the city was $22,365. About 5.1% of families and 8.2% of the population were below the poverty line, including 8.6% of those under age 18 and 4.7% of those age 65 or over.

7.1% of the people under the age of 65 years are disabled while 8.6% people don't have health insurance.

The city of Virginia Beach has a lower crime rate than the other regional cities of Hampton Roads, Newport News, Norfolk, and Portsmouth, which all exceed national average crime rates. In 1999 Virginia Beach experienced 12 murders giving the city a murder rate of 2.7 per 100,000 people. For 2007, Virginia Beach had 16 murders, for a murder rate of 3.7 per 100,000 people. That was lower than the national average that year of 6.9. The city's total crime index rate for 2007 was 221.2 per 100,000 people, lower than the national average of 320.9. According to the Congressional Quarterly Press '2008 City Crime Rankings: Crime in Metropolitan America, Virginia Beach, Virginia ranks 311th in violent crime among 385 cities containing more than 75,000 inhabitants.

Religion 

34.4% of the city's population is affiliated with religious congregations, compared to the 50.2% nationwide figure. There are 146,402 adherents and 184 different religious congregations in the city.
 28% Catholic Church
 14% Southern Baptist Convention
 13% United Methodist Church
 12% Charismatic Churches Independent
 33% Others

Economy
Virginia Beach is composed of a variety of industries, including national and international corporate headquarters, advanced manufacturers, defense contractors and locally owned businesses. The city's location and business climate have made it a hub of international commerce, as nearly 200 foreign firms have established a presence, an office location or their North American headquarters in Hampton Roads. Twenty internationally based firms have their U.S. or North American headquarters in Virginia Beach, including companies like Stihl, Busch Vacuum Solutions, IMS Gear, and Sanjo Corte Fino. Other major companies headquartered in Virginia Beach include Amerigroup, the Christian Broadcasting Network and Operation Blessing International. Other major employers include GEICO, VT and Navy Exchange Service Command. In addition, Virginia Beach is home to a number of small, innovative companies, such as Morphix Technologies, who cater for military industry. Virginia Beach was ranked at number 45 on Forbes list of best places for business and careers.

Tourism produces a large share of Virginia Beach's economy. With an estimated $857 million spent in tourism related industries, 14,900 jobs cater to 2.75 million visitors. City coffers benefit as visitors provide $73 million in revenue. Virginia Beach opened a Convention Center in 2005 which caters to large group meetings and events. Hotels not only line the oceanfront but also cluster around Virginia Beach Town Center and other parts of the city. Restaurants and entertainment industries also directly benefit from Virginia Beach's tourism.

Virginia Beach has a large agribusiness sector which produces $80 million for the city economy. One hundred-seventy-two farms exist in Virginia Beach, mostly below the greenline in the southern portion of the city. Farmers are able to sell their goods and products at the city's Farmer's Market.

Virginia Beach is home to several United States Military bases. These include the United States Navy's NAS Oceana and Training Support Center Hampton Roads, and the Joint Expeditionary Base East located at Cape Henry.
Additionally, NAB Little Creek is located mostly within the city of Virginia Beach but carries a Norfolk address.

NAS Oceana is the largest employer in Virginia Beach; it was decreed by the 2005 BRAC Commission that NAS Oceana must close unless the city of Virginia Beach condemns houses in areas designated as "Accident Potential Zones." This action has never been the position of the United States Navy; indeed, the Navy had not recommended NAS Oceana to the BRAC Commission for potential closure.

Both NAS Oceana and Training Support Center Hampton Roads are considered to be the largest of their respective kind in the world. Furthermore, located in nearby Norfolk is the central hub of the United States Navy's Atlantic Fleet, Norfolk Navy Base.

54% of the 171,000 people working in Virginia Beach live in the city, 12% live in Chesapeake, and 10% live in Norfolk. An additional 99,600 people commute from Virginia Beach, with 35% going to Norfolk and 23% going to Chesapeake. Unemployment has been cut almost in half over the past two years going from a high of 4.2% in January 2017 to 2.8% in June 2019.

Culture

The city is home to several points of interest in the historical, scientific, and visual/performing arts areas, and has become a popular tourist destination in recent years. The Virginia Museum of Contemporary Art features regularly changing exhibitions in a variety of media. Exhibitions feature painting, sculpture, photography, glass, video and other visual media from internationally acclaimed artists as well as artists of national and regional renown. MOCA was born from the annual Boardwalk Art Show, which began in 1952 and is now the museum's largest fundraiser.

The Virginia Aquarium & Marine Science Center (formerly the Virginia Marine Science Museum) is a popular aquarium near the oceanfront that features various sharks, sting rays, sea turtles, jellyfish, and octopuses.

One of the world's largest collections of World War I and World War II aircraft is located at the Military Aviation Museum in the Pungo area of Virginia Beach.

The Veterans United Home Loans Amphitheater at Virginia Beach, built in 1996, features a wide variety of popular shows and concerts. The Sandler Center, a 1200-seat performing arts theatre, opened in the Virginia Beach Town Center in November 2007.

Virginia Beach is home to many sites of historical importance and has 18 sites on the National Register of Historic Places. Such sites include the Adam Thoroughgood House (one of the oldest surviving colonial homes in Virginia), the Francis Land House (a 200-year-old plantation), the Cape Henry Lights and nearby Cape Henry Light Station (a second tower), De Witt Cottage, Adam Keeling House, and others.

The Edgar Cayce Hospital for Research and Enlightenment was established in Virginia Beach in 1928 with 60 beds. The 67th street facility features a large private library of books on psychic matters, and is open to the public. The traditional beach-architecture headquarters building features massage therapy by appointment. Cayce opened Atlantic University in 1930; it closed two years later but was re-opened in 1985. Atlantic University was originally intended for study of Cayce's readings and research on spiritual subjects.

The city's largest festival, the Neptune Festival, attracts 500,000 visitors to the oceanfront and 350,000 visitors to the air show at NAS Oceana. Celebrating the city's heritage link with Norway, events are held in September in the oceanfront and Town Center areas. Every Labor Day Weekend, the American Music Festival provides festival attendees with live music performed on stages all over the oceanfront, including the beach on Fifth Street. The festival ends with the Rock 'n' Roll Half Marathon.

Sports

Since Norfolk contains the central business district of Hampton Roads, most of the major spectator sports are located there. While the Hampton Roads area has been recently considered as a viable prospect for major-league professional sports, and regional leaders have attempted to obtain Major League Baseball, NBA and NHL franchises in the recent past, no team has yet relocated to the area. Hampton Roads is the largest metropolitan area in the United States without a club in a major professional sports league.

The Norfolk Admirals won the AHL Calder Cup in 2012.

The Virginia Destroyers, a UFL franchise, played at the Virginia Beach Sportsplex until the league's collapse in 2012. Virginia Beach Professional Baseball, LLC, was awarded an Atlantic League franchise in April 2013. Known as the Virginia Beach Neptunes, they have yet to play a game due to delays in building Wheeler Field. Two soccer teams, the Virginia Beach Piranhas, a men's team in the USL Premier Development League, and the Hampton Roads Piranhas, a women's team in the W-League play at the Virginia Beach Sportsplex. The Virginia Beach Sportsplex contains the central training site for the U.S. women's national field hockey team.

The city is also home to the East Coast Surfing Championships, an annual contest of more than 100 of the world's top professional surfers and an estimated 400 amateur surfers. This is North America's oldest surfing contest.

There are eleven golf courses open to the public in the city, as well as four country club layouts and 36 military holes at NAS Oceana's Aeropines course. Among the best-known public courses are Hell's Point Golf Club and Virginia Beach National, the latter of which hosted the Virginia Beach Open, a Nationwide Tour event from 2000 to 2006. Also, the Kingsmill Resort in nearby Williamsburg hosts the Kingsmill Championship, an annual LPGA Tour tournament.

Virginia Beach is host to a Rock 'n' Roll Half Marathon each year on Labor Day weekend in conjunction with the American Music Festival. It is one of the largest Half Marathons in the world. The final  are on the boardwalk. Virginia Beach also hosts the Yuengling Shamrock Marathon, founded in 1973 with over 24,000 participants. It is an annual race over St. Patrick's Day weekend and was recognized by Runner's World as one of the Top 20 marathons in the country in 1992.

Parks and recreation

Mount Trashmore Park is clearly visible from I-264 when traveling to the oceanfront.

One of the major parks is Red Wing Park, a  park in east-central part of the city, very close to Oceana Naval Air Station. This land became a park in 1966. A unique feature of this park is the Miyazaki Japanese Garden, which is a result of its interactions with its sister city Miyazaki, Japan.

The Back Bay National Wildlife Refuge, established in 1938, is an  fresh water refuge that borders the Atlantic Ocean on the east and Back Bay on the west. It is managed by the U.S. Fish and Wildlife Service.

First Landing State Park and False Cape State Park are both located in coastal areas within the city's corporate limits as well.

Munden Point Park is a rural park located in the deep southern end of the city, right on The North Landing River.

Pleasure House Point is an  park of undeveloped land on the shore of the Lynnhaven River. It is also the location of the Brock Environmental Center.

Virginia Beach's extensive park system is recognized as one of the best in the United States. In its 2013 ParkScore ranking, The Trust for Public Land reported that Virginia Beach had the 8th best park system among the 50 most populous U.S. cities.

Government
 

Historically, Virginia Beach had been more conservative than other large independent cities in Virginia. It consistently backed Republican Party presidential candidates from 1968 to 2016, and in all but two elections from 1952 to 2016. However, the Republican edge in the city has diminished in recent years. John McCain and Donald Trump only managed to win a plurality of the city's votes in 2008 and 2016, winning the city despite losing statewide. In  2020, Joe Biden became the first Democrat to carry Virginia Beach since 1964, and only the third to do so since Virginia Beach became an independent city. Biden became the first presidential candidate to win at least 51% of the vote in Virginia Beach since President George W. Bush in 2004.

Virginia Beach was chartered as a municipal corporation by the General Assembly of Virginia on January 1, 1963. The city currently operates under the council–manager form of government. The city does not fall under the jurisdiction of a county government, due to state law. Rather, it functions as an independent city and operates as a political subdivision of the state.

The city's legislative body consists of an eleven-member city council. The city manager is appointed by the council and acts as the chief executive officer. Through his staff, he implements policies established by the council.

Members of the city council normally serve four-year terms and are elected on a staggered basis in non-partisan elections. Beginning in 2008, general elections are held the first Tuesday in November in even-numbered years. In previous years, elections were held the first Tuesday in May in even-numbered years. All registered voters are eligible to vote for all council members. Three council members and the mayor serve on an at-large basis. All others are elected by district (and must live in the district they represent): Bayside, Beach, Centerville, Kempsville, Lynnhaven, Princess Anne, and Rose Hall.

The mayor is elected to a four-year term through direct election. The mayor presides over city council meetings, and serves as the ceremonial head and spokesperson of the city. A vice mayor is also elected by the city council at the first meeting following a council election.

Citizens of Virginia Beach also elect five constitutional officers, and candidates for these offices are permitted to run with an affiliated political party. Three of these offices deal substantially with public safety and justice: the sheriff, commonwealth's attorney, and the clerk of the circuit court. The two other offices are concerned with fiscal policy: the city treasurer and the commissioner of the revenue.

Education

According to the U.S. Census, 28.1% of the population over twenty-five (vs. a national average of 24%) hold a bachelor's degree or higher, and 90.4% (vs. 80% nationally) have a high school diploma or equivalent.

Prior to 1969, separate schools were maintained for black and white students. Before 1938, black students who wished to attend school past seventh grade had to travel to Norfolk, and pay tuition to attend Booker T. Washington High School. In 1938, the first high school for blacks, the Princess Anne County Training School was built. In 1961, in order to avoid the stigma of the term "training school", the school was renamed Union Kempsville High School at the request of the black community. When the public schools integrated in 1969, Union Kempsville was closed.

The city of Virginia Beach is home to Virginia Beach City Public Schools, one of the largest school systems in the state (based on student enrollment). Virginia Beach City Public Schools currently serves 69,735 students, and includes 56 elementary schools, 14 middle schools, 12 high schools which include Landstown, Princess Anne, Green Run, Green Run Collegiate, Cox, Tallwood, Salem, First Colonial, Kellam, Kempsville,
Bayside, and Ocean Lakes High Schools as well as a number of secondary/post-secondary specialty schools and centers such as the Advanced Technology Center (ATC).

There are also a number of private, independent schools in the city, including Chesapeake Bay Academy and Tidewater Collegiate Academy (both on the campus of Virginia Wesleyan University), Our Lady of Mount Carmel Catholic School and Parish, Strelitz International Academy (formerly the Hebrew Academy of Tidewater), Cape Henry Collegiate School,  Catholic High School (formerly Bishop Sullivan Catholic and, before that, Norfolk Catholic), Baylake Pines School, (closed in 2014), and Virginia Beach Friends School.

 

Virginia Beach is home to three universities and branch centers for several other universities. Atlantic University a for-profit holistic learning institution is located in Virginia Beach and was founded in 1930. Regent University, a private university founded by Christian evangelist and leader Pat Robertson, has historically focused on graduate education but has recently established an undergraduate program as well. Virginia Wesleyan University is a private university in Virginia Beach, Virginia, that was founded in 1961 by Methodist minister Joseph Shackford Johnston.

Old Dominion University and Norfolk State University are in nearby Norfolk but operate a joint Center in Virginia Beach. Both the University of Virginia and Virginia Tech operate satellite campuses in Virginia Beach. Tidewater Community College, a major junior college, also has its largest campus located in the city. ECPI University's, a for-profit career college, has its headquarters in Virginia Beach. Additional institutions of higher education are located in other communities of greater Hampton Roads.

The Virginia Beach Public Library System provides free access to accurate and current information and materials to all individuals, and promotes reading as a critical life skill. The Library system has a collection of more than 1 million items including special subject collections.

Media
The Virginian-Pilot, based in Norfolk, is the daily newspaper for Virginia Beach. Other papers include Veer and the New Journal and Guide. Inside Business focuses on local business news.

The Hampton Roads/Norfolk/Portsmouth/Virginia Beach area is served by a variety of radio stations on the AM and FM bands, with towers located around the Hampton Roads area.

Virginia Beach is also served by several television stations. The Norfolk-Portsmouth-Newport News designated market area (DMA) is the 42nd largest in the U.S. with 712,790 homes (0.64% of the total U.S.). The major network television affiliates are WTKR 3 (CBS), WAVY-TV 10 (NBC), WVEC 13 (ABC), WTPC-TV 21 (Trinity Broadcasting Network), WGNT 27 (CW), WTVZ-TV 33 (MyNetworkTV), WVBT 43 (Fox), and WPXV 49 (ION Television). The Public Broadcasting Service station is WHRO-TV 15. Virginia Beach residents also can receive independent station WSKY broadcasting on channel 4 from Camden County, North Carolina. Some can also receive PBS affiliate WUND 2 (UNC-TV), Home Shopping Network affiliate W14DC-D from Portsmouth, Daystar Network religious television station WVAD-LD TV 25 from Chesapeake and RTV affiliate WGBS-LD broadcasting on channel 7 from Hampton. Virginia Beach is served by Cox Cable. DirecTV and Dish Network are also popular as an alternative to cable television in Virginia Beach. In addition a large portion of the city is served by Verizon FIOS.

Virginia Beach serves as the headquarters for the Christian Broadcasting Network, located adjacent to Regent University. CBN's most notable program, The 700 Club originates from the Virginia Beach studios. In 2008, Virginia Beach became the home to the Reel Dreams Film Festival.

Infrastructure

Transportation

 

Virginia Beach is primarily served by the Norfolk International Airport , which is now the region's major commercial airport. The airport is located near Chesapeake Bay, along the city limits straddling neighboring Norfolk. Newport News/Williamsburg International Airport also provides commercial air service for the Hampton Roads area. The Chesapeake Regional Airport provides general aviation services and is located  outside the city limits.

Virginia Beach Airport is a small, grass runway facility catering to private aircraft owners.

Rail-wise, Virginia Beach is served by Amtrak through the Norfolk and Newport News stations, via connecting buses. A high-speed rail connection at Richmond to both the Northeast Corridor and the Southeast High Speed Rail Corridor are also under study.

Greyhound/Trailways provides service from a central bus terminal in adjacent Norfolk. The Greyhound station in Virginia Beach is located on Laskin Road, about a mile west of the oceanfront. Bus services to New York City via the Chinatown bus, Today's Bus, is located on Newtown Road.

The city is connected to I-64 via I-264, which runs from the oceanfront, intersects with I-64 on the east side of Norfolk, and continues through downtown Norfolk and Portsmouth until rejoining I-64 at the terminus of both roads in Chesapeake where Interstate 664 completes the loop which forms the Hampton Roads Beltway. Other major roads include Virginia Beach Boulevard (U.S. Route 58), Shore Drive (U.S. Route 60), which connects to Atlantic Avenue at the oceanfront, Northampton Blvd (U.S. Route 13), Princess Anne Road (State Route 165), Indian River Road (former State Route 603), Lynnhaven Parkway, Independence Boulevard, General Booth Boulevard, and Nimmo Parkway.

The city is also connected to Virginia's Eastern Shore region via the Chesapeake Bay Bridge-Tunnel (CBBT), which is the longest bridge-tunnel complex in the world and known as one of the Seven Engineering Wonders of the Modern World. The CBBT, a tolled facility carries U.S. Route 13.

Transportation within the city, as well as the rest of Hampton Roads is served by a regional bus service, Hampton Roads Transit. An extension of The Tide light rail system from Norfolk to the oceanfront is currently being studied.

Walkability
A 2011 study by Walk Score ranked Virginia Beach 39th most walkable of fifty largest U.S. cities. A 2021 study by Walk Score ranked Virginia beach as 45th most walkable large city in the United States.

Utilities
Water and sewer services are provided by the City's Department of Utilities. Virginia Beach receives its electricity from Dominion Virginia Power which has local sources including the Chesapeake Energy Center (a gas power plant), coal-fired plants in Chesapeake and Southampton County, and the Surry Nuclear Power Plant. Norfolk headquartered Virginia Natural Gas, a subsidiary of AGL Resources, distributes natural gas to the city from storage plants in James City County and Chesapeake.

Currently, water for the Tidewater area is pumped from Lake Gaston, which straddles the Virginia-North Carolina border along with the Blackwater and Nottoway rivers.

The city provides wastewater services for residents and transports wastewater to the regional Hampton Roads Sanitation District treatment plants.

Broadband internet service is provided by Cox Communications throughout the majority of the city. Verizon also provides its Fios internet service, but in limited areas as of 2021.

Healthcare
Virginia Beach is served by Sentara Virginia Beach General Hospital and Sentara Princess Anne Hospital. The former Sentara Bayside Hospital, now known as Sentara Independence, has been modified to a stand alone Emergency Department and outpatient treatment center. Sentara Leigh Hospital is just across the city line in Norfolk. Beach Health clinic offers basic medical services for uninsured residents of Virginia Beach.

Sister cities
Virginia Beach's sister Cities are:
 Ards and North Down, Northern Ireland, United Kingdom (2001)
 Miyazaki, Japan (1992)
 Moss, Norway (1974)
 Olongapo, Philippines (2015)
 Waiblingen, Germany (2016)

Friendly cities
Virginia Beach has friendly relations with:
 San Juan del Sur, Nicaragua (1974)

Notable people
 
 Corey Ashe (b. 1986), professional soccer player for the Houston Dynamo
 Wade Barrett (b. 1976), professional soccer player for the Houston Dynamo
 Felicia Barton, semi-finalist on American Idol
 Kharlton Belmar, professional soccer player for Portland Timbers 2
 Rudy Boesch, retired Navy SEAL and contestant on Survivor
 Jamelle Bouie, journalist, New York Times columnist, and political analyst
 Bill Bray, MLB player
 Jon Busch, Hampton Roads Mariner; Major League Soccer
 Curtis Bush, kickboxer
 Darren Caskey, Hampton Roads Mariner; Tottenham Hotspur; Reading
 Gabby Douglas, Olympic gymnastics gold medalist
 D.J. Dozier, football / baseball from Virginia Beach; Penn State All-American, first-round NFL draft 14th pick by Minnesota Vikings who was also drafted by major league baseball by the Detroit Tigers in the 18th round in 1983 (459th overall)
 Jason Dubois, MLB player 
 Trey Freeman, professional basketball player in the HT Premijer liga
 Genesis the Greykid, artist, creative, poet, writer
 Percy Harvin, NFL player 
 Michael Hearst, author, musician, and composer
 Daniel Hudson, MLB player
 Jay Hoffman, coached Hampton Roads Mariners; played professionally in the Canadian National Soccer League
 Bubba Jenkins, NCAA Division I wrestling national champion and MMA fighter
 Roy Lassiter, Hampton Roads Mariner; Major League Soccer; USA National Team
 B. J. Leiderman, composer of themes for NPR shows
 Marc Leishman, professional golfer
 Darin Lewis, Hampton Roads Mariner; MLS New York MetroStars
 EJ Manuel – NFL quarterback for the Oakland Raiders
 Evan Marriott, actor in Joe Millionaire
 Bob McDonnell, former Governor of Virginia 
 Jason Miyares, Attorney General of Virginia
 Shane McFaul, Hampton Roads Mariner; Republic of Ireland U21
 Ryan McGinness, artist 
 Kára McCullough, winner of Miss USA 2017, finished top ten in Miss Universe 2017
 Darryl Monroe, professional basketball player, 2016 Israeli Basketball Premier League MVP
 Shawn Morimando, MLB player
 Lenda Murray, IFBB professional bodybuilder
 Jamia Nash, singer, actress
 Juice Newton, singer, songwriter
 Derrick Nnadi, NFL defensive tackle
 Sean Poppen, MLB player
 Pusha T, rapper
 David Robinson, 10x All-star, NBA MVP, 2x NBA Champion, San Antonio Spurs, 2x Olympic Gold medalist, Member of Naismith Memorial Basketball Hall of Fame, briefly grew up in Virginia Beach 
Teddy Riley, music producer
 Neil Ramírez, MLB player
 J.R. Reid, NBA player
 Mark Reynolds, third baseman/first baseman for the Baltimore Orioles from Virginia Beach; drafted in 2004 by the Arizona Diamondbacks in the 16th round (476th overall)
 Pat Robertson, television preacher
 Aaron Rouse,  NFL Player
 Mark Ruffalo, Oscar-nominated actor; raised in Virginia Beach
 Todd Schnitt, radio personality
 Herbert Scott – Kellam High School, Virginia Union University, Dallas Cowboys offensive lineman in NFL for 10 seasons, 3× Pro Bowl, 2× First-team All-Pro, winner of Super Bowl XII
 Rhea Seehorn, actress known for role as Kim Wexler in Better Call Saul
 Scott Sizemore, MLB player
 Chris Taylor, MLB player
 Ian Thomas, MLB player
 Shamarko Thomas – Pittsburgh Steelers safety and 111th pick overall in the 2013 NFL Draft; starred at Ocean Lakes High School in Virginia Beach
 Timbaland, music producer
 Lil Tracy, rapper, singer and songwriter 
 Kendra Todd, real estate broker, winner of The Appreciate
 Turnover, indie rock band
 Travis Wall, choreographer and contestant on So You Think You Can Dance
 Elizabeth Williams, played college basketball at Duke University, WNBA player for Washington Mystics 
 Mark Williams, played college basketball for Duke Blue Devils, NBA player for Charlotte Hornets
 Matthew E. White, songwriter and producer
 Matt Williams, MLB player
 Pharrell Williams, rapper, singer, record producer, composer and fashion designer
 Glenn Yates Jr., architect and Virginia state legislator
 Glenn Youngkin, Governor of Virginia
 Ryan Zimmerman, MLB player

In popular culture
The Monopoly Here and Now: The US edition (2015) of the game, released in honor of the game's 80th birthday, included Virginia Beach as a property that could be bought, sold and traded. The city was included after Hasbro held an online vote in order to determine which cities would make it into an updated version of the game. Virginia Beach received the fourth highest number of votes in the online contest, earning it a green spot on the board. The top Boardwalk spot went to Pierre, South Dakota.

In the television series, The Man in the High Castle (2015–2019), which is set in an alternate 1960s, Virginia Beach is mentioned as being the site of a D-Day style invasion by Nazi Germany, which led to the defeat of the United States and its occupation.

See also

 List of people from Virginia Beach
 National Register of Historic Places listings in Virginia Beach, Virginia
 Norwegian Lady Statues
 Virginia Beach Department of EMS
 Virginia Beach Fire Department
 Virginia Beach Police Department
 Virginia Beach Volunteer Rescue Squad
 Wash Woods at False Cape 
 East Coast of the United States 
 Southeastern United States 
 Southern United States

Notes

References

External links

 
 Convention and Visitors Bureau

 
1906 establishments in Virginia
Beaches of Virginia
Cities in Virginia
Landforms of Virginia Beach, Virginia
Populated coastal places in Virginia
Populated places in Hampton Roads
Populated places established in 1906
Seaside resorts in the United States
Surfing in Virginia
Surfing locations in the United States
Longest beaches